USCGC Tampa (ex-Miami) was a Miami-class cutter that initially served in the U.S. Revenue Cutter Service, followed by service in the U.S. Coast Guard and the U.S. Navy. Tampa was used extensively on the International Ice Patrol and also during the Gasparilla Carnival at Tampa, Florida and other regattas as a patrol vessel. It was sunk with the highest American naval combat casualty loss in World War I.

U.S. Revenue Cutter Service
Miami, a cutter built for the Revenue Cutter Service by the Newport News Shipbuilding and Drydock Corporation, was authorized 21 April 1910; launched on 10 February 1912; and placed in commission by the Revenue Cutter Service at its depot at Arundel Cove, Maryland on 19 August 1912.

During the following five years, Miami performed duties typical for cutters. She served several times on the International Ice Patrol, operating out of New York City and Halifax, Nova Scotia, to locate icebergs which might be hazardous to navigation. Her first patrol began on 13 May 1913 out of Halifax, and her last ended on 11 June 1915 when she was relieved by USRC Seneca.

On other occasions, she operated out of various stations along the eastern seaboard enforcing navigation and fishing laws. Her most frequent bases of operation during that period were Key West and Tampa, Florida; the USRC Depot at Arundel Cove, and New York City. Beginning in 1914 she participated in patrolling the Gasparilla Carnival at Tampa each year in February.

U.S. Coast Guard
On 28 January 1915, the United States Revenue Cutter Service and the United States Life-Saving Service were merged to form the present-day United States Coast Guard. A year later, on 1 February 1916, USCGC Miami was renamed USCGC Tampa just before the start of the annual Gasparilla Pirate Festival in Tampa, Florida.

U.S. Navy in World War I
On 6 April 1917, when the United States entered World War I, Tampa was transferred from Coast Guard control to Navy control for the duration of hostilities, but remained crewed by Coast Guardsmen. On the morning of 9 April, crew members from Tampa and  boarded the Austrian steamer Borneo in Hillsboro Bay near Tampa, seizing the ship and arresting the crew. Borneo was turned over to U.S. Customs authorities and the crew was left in the custody of local authorities. During the next four months, she received heavier armament by trading her three six-pounders for two three-inch (76 mm), a pair of machine guns, and depth charge throwers and racks. Ordered to duty overseas, the warship departed New York on 29 September in company with Paducah, and five French-manned, American-made submarine chasers in tow. After stops at Halifax, Nova Scotia, and Ponta Delgada in the Azores, Tampa and her sailing mates reached Gibraltar on 27 October 1917.

Her war service lasted just eleven months. During that time, she was assigned ocean escort duty protecting convoys from German submarines on the route between Gibraltar and the southern coast of England. Between 27 October 1917 and 31 July 1918, she escorted eighteen convoys between Gibraltar and Great Britain, losing only two ships out of all those escorted.

During the late afternoon of 26 September 1918, Tampa parted company with convoy HG-107, which she had just escorted into the Irish Sea from Gibraltar. Ordered to put into Milford Haven, Wales, she proceeded independently toward her destination. According to the submarine war diary entry, the U-boat dived and maneuvered into an attack position, firing one torpedo out of the stern tube at 2015 from a range of about 550 meters. Minutes later, the torpedo hit Tampa and exploded portside amidships, throwing up a huge, luminous column of water. The cutter sank with all hands: 111 Coast Guardsmen, 4 U.S. Navy personnel, and 16 passengers consisting of 11 British Navy personnel and 5 civilians.

Alerted by the convoy flagship, whose radio operator reported having felt the shock of an underwater explosion at about 2045, search and rescue efforts over the succeeding three days turned up only some wreckage, clearly identified as coming from Tampa, and a single unidentified body. Three bodies were later recovered, two from a beach near Lamphey, Wales, and the other at sea by a British patrol boat. Tampa was struck from the Navy list as of the date of her sinking.

Legacy

The loss of Tampa is commemorated by the United States Coast Guard Memorial at Arlington National Cemetery and in the chapel at the Brookwood American Cemetery and Memorial in Surrey, England. When five Eagle-class patrol craft of the Navy were transferred to the U.S. Coast Guard in late 1919, they were renamed in honor of Tampa officers. Two U.S. Navy destroyers have been named in honor of her commander, Capt. Charles Satterlee. She is mentioned in the roll of honor in the second verse of Semper Paratus, the Coast Guard's official march. On Veterans Day, 11 November 1999, the 111 crewmen of Tampa were posthumously presented with the Purple Heart by Secretary of Transportation Rodney E. Slater in ceremonies held at Arlington National Cemetery.

Notes
Footnotes

Citations

References used

External links
 American Battle Monuments Commission – USCGC Tampa dead 
United States Coast Guard Memorial at ArlingtonCemetery.net, an unofficial website

Ships built in Newport News, Virginia
1912 ships
Ships of the United States Coast Guard
World War I patrol vessels of the United States
Ships sunk by German submarines in World War I
Shipwrecks in the English Channel
Ships lost with all hands
Maritime incidents in 1918